James Arthur Greenham (16 November 1915 – 20 June 1993) was an Australian rules footballer who played with Footscray in the Victorian Football League (VFL).

Notes

External links 

1915 births
Australian rules footballers from Victoria (Australia)
Western Bulldogs players
1993 deaths